Lai Runming (Chinese: 赖润明; 5 May 1963 - ) is a former male Chinese weightlifter. He won a silver medal at 1984 Olympic Games in Men's 56 kg.

References

1963 births
Living people
Chinese male weightlifters
Olympic weightlifters of China
Weightlifters at the 1984 Summer Olympics
Olympic silver medalists for China
Olympic medalists in weightlifting
Medalists at the 1984 Summer Olympics
Asian Games medalists in weightlifting
Weightlifters at the 1986 Asian Games
Asian Games gold medalists for China
Medalists at the 1986 Asian Games
20th-century Chinese people